Count of Osorno is a Spanish hereditary peerage which was granted on 31 August 1445 by John II of Castile to Gabriel Fernández Manrique, first Duke of Galisteo (1451), son of Garci Fernandez Manrique, first Count of Castañeda.

On the death in 1675 of Ana Apolonia Manrique de Lara, 8th countess, and in the absence of an heir, the title went to the House of Alba, who is currently still holding it.

The name of the peerage refers to the municipality of Osorno la Mayor, in the province of Palencia, Castile and León, Spain.

Counts of Osorno (1445) 
 Gabriel Fernández Manrique, 1st Count of Osorno (died 1482)
 Pedro Fernández Manrique y Vivero, 2nd Count of Osorno (died 1515)
 García Fernández Manrique, 3rd Count of Osorno (died 1546)
 Pedro Fernández Manrique y Cabrera, 4th Count of Osorno (died 1569)
 García Fernández Manrique y Córdoba, 5th Count of Osorno (died 1587)
 Pedro Fernández Manrique y Enríquez, 6th Count of Osorno (died 1589)
 García Manrique y Zapata, 7th Count of Osorno (died 1635)
 Ana Apolonia Manrique de Lara, 8th Countess of Osorno (died 1675)
 Antonio Álvarez de Toledo y Enríquez de Ribera, 9th Count of Osorno (died 1690)
 The list continued with the Dukes of Alba de Tormes until it was ceded in 2015 to the 19th Duke of Alba's younger son, Carlos Fitz-James Stuart de Solís (b. 1991), 22nd Count of Osorno.

References 

 Portal Grandes de España: genealogía del Condado de Osorno

Counts of Osorno
Counts of Spain
Grandees of Spain
Lists of counts
Lists of Spanish nobility